Sheykhdarabad (also Romanized as Sheykhdarābād and Sheikhdarābād) is a village in Sheykhdarabad Rural District of the Central District of Mianeh County, East Azerbaijan province, Iran. At the 2006 National Census, its population was 2,154 in 451 households. The following census in 2011 counted 2,079 people in 587 households. The latest census in 2016 showed a population of 1,681 people in 505 households; it was the largest village in its rural district.

References 

Meyaneh County

Populated places in East Azerbaijan Province

Populated places in Meyaneh County